This is a list of the top selling albums in New Zealand for 2010.

Chart

Key
 – Album of New Zealand origin

References

2010 in New Zealand music
2010 record charts
Albums 2010